The 2005 Volta a Catalunya was the 85th edition of the Volta a Catalunya cycling race, which took place from 16 May to 22 May 2005, in Catalonia, Spain. The race began in Salou with a team time trial and ended in Barcelona. Yaroslav Popovych won the first major win of his career.

Teams
Twenty-three teams of up to eight riders started the race:

 
 
 
 
 
 
 
 
 
 
 
 
 
 
 
 
 
 
 
 
 Kaiku

Route

Stages

Stage 1
16 May 2005 - Salou,  (TTT)

Stage 2
17 May 2005 - Cambrils,

Stage 3
18 May 2005 - Salou to La Granada,

Stage 4
19 May 2005 - Perafort to Pal-Arinsal,

Stage 5
20 May 2005 - Sornàs to Ordino-Arcalis,  (ITT)

Stage 6
21 May 2005 - Llívia to Pallejà,

Stage 7
22 May 2005 - Pallejà to Barcelona,

Final standings

General classification

Mountains classification

Points classification

Best team

References

External links
Race website

2005
Volta
2005 in Spanish road cycling
2005 UCI ProTour
May 2005 sports events in Europe